The Kunar Provincial Reconstruction Team is one of the Provincial Reconstruction Teams in Afghanistan.
Kunar is a rugged mountainous province, and the team has built five new bridges.
The team has built or reconstructed a number of roads and irrigation canals.
The team's medical component has participated in helping to reconstruct Kunar's medical system.

References

Kunar Province